Isla Mejia is an island in the Gulf of California east of the Baja California Peninsula. The island is uninhabited and is part of the Mexicali Municipality.

Biology
Isla Mejia has six species of reptiles: Hypsiglena ochrorhyncha (coast night snake), Lichanura trivirgata (rosy boa), Petrosaurus slevini (Slevin's banded rock lizard), Phyllodactylus nocticolus (peninsular leaf-toed gecko), Sauromalus hispidus (spiny chuckwalla), and Uta stansburiana (common side-blotched lizard).

References

Islands of Mexicali Municipality
Islands of Baja California
Islands of the Gulf of California
Uninhabited islands of Mexico